Chafal (also Romanized as Chofel; also known as Chepul, Chofīl, Pol-e Shomrūd, and Shamrūd) is a village in Baz Kia Gurab Rural District, in the Central District of Lahijan County, Gilan Province, Iran. At the 2006 census, its population was 401, in 125 families.

References 

Populated places in Lahijan County